Klemen Slakonja (born 3 June 1985) is a Slovenian singer. He is employed at the Ljubljana Slovene National Theatre Drama and acting in it is his primary occupation.

He studied at the Academy of Theatre, Radio, Film and Television. Slakonja is known in Slovenia for his comedy sketches often made in the form of music videos as well as for anchoring various TV shows such as the Eurovision Song Contest in his home country. He has made numerous impersonations of Slovenian musicians, Slovene philosopher Slavoj Žižek, Pope Francis, Vladimir Putin, Donald Trump, Angela Merkel and others.

Career 

He was born in a Slovenian border town Brežice. His early impersonations started around second year of high school. He started his career at local Radio Energy near his home in the town of Krško, which is the most known for having the only nuclear powerplant in Slovenia. He was the radio anchor and he was hosting many different kind of local events.

2007: Breakthrough after Radio Ga Ga show 

In late summer of 2007, he hosted the home reception for Slovenian world class hammer throw champion Primož Kozmus in Brežice, to celebrate his silver medal from 2007 World Championships in Athletics in Osaka. To honour Primož Kozmus he translated the Slovenian Christmas song "Bela snežinka" to "Sivo kladivo" (Grey Hammer) and impersonated it with voices of various Slovenian popular musicians. That's when radio host Edi Štraus noticed him and recommended him to Sašo Hribar, satirical TV and radio host.

On 5 October 2007, Sašo Hribar invited Slakonja to make his first public performance on the national level to his satirical radio show called Radio Ga Ga where they are mocking mostly of out of Slovenian politicians and which is broadcast weekly on first channel of Slovenian National Radio. He imitated Slovenian ballad singer Rok Kosmač which was the breaking point of his career and after this performance suddenly became known to a wide Slovenian audience.

Just a month later in November 2007, he made the first public television appearance at satirical television show Hri-bar hosted by Sašo Hribar which was mocking animated characters, mostly Slovenian politicians. Show was broadcast on RTV Slovenia national television. Show hosted regular and also musical guests where Slakonja performed mocking Slovenian musicians with perfect voice and disguise impersonation.

2008: Suddenly became host on national TV 
On 17 February 2008 he practically over night became a national television host taking over popular Sunday afternoon family show called "NLP" on RTV Slovenia. He became a co-host with Tjaša Železnik who previously run this show alone for about two years.

2011: First time hosting EMA Festival 
On 27 February 2011 he first time hosted EMA music festival competition, a Slovenian entry for Eurovision Song Contest 2011 and the winner was Maja Keuc. To honour this festival he wrote music and presented "16 let skomin", a mix song of all sixteen EMA festival winners. So far he was hosting this festival for three more times, in 2012, 2016 and 2020. In 2016 he presented "Putin, Putout" in the EMA show.

2013: Zadetek v petek & Je bella cesta 

On 15 February 2013 he hosted his first own comedy show "Zadetek v petek" (Full on Friday) which was broadcast on commercial TV3 Medias. The whole thing was shot in Belgrade, however the show was canceled only few months later after only one season. Shortly after he started hosting his second own comedy show "Je bella cesta" (Damn) which lasted for two seasons from October 2013 to May 2014.

2015: Zadžuskaj hit song in commercial 

He wrote "Zadžuskaj" (Juice it) song was released in 2014. He shot a music video in which he plays DeciDeci Klemzy, an awkward nerd character. Jingle was used in a two commercials for health insurance company and became summer hit of the year 2015.

2016: Putin, Putout and international fame 

His comedy sketch "Putin, Putout" gained international popularity. This was the first video he shot as part of his TheMockingbirdMan project. The video parodies Russian president Vladimir Putin. Shortly after airing on Slovene television, the comedy sketch was uploaded to Slakonja's personal YouTube channel where it went viral.

His second TheMockingbirdMan project video entitled "Golden Dump (The Trump Hump)" impersonating Donald Trump has premiered on 17 July 2016 at Siti Teater BTC Ljubljana. Two days later it was uploaded to Slakonja's personal YouTube channel.

Work

Radio

Television

Film

Web series

List of parodies

TheMockingbirdMan project 
A project where he is impersonating and making fun of world leaders.

References

External links 
 

1985 births
Living people
People from Brežice
Slovenian male actors
Slovenian comedians
Slovenian television personalities
Slovenian YouTubers